Brat, Brats, The Brat or similar may refer to:

Term for young people 
 Spoiled child 
 Military brat
 Military brat (U.S. subculture)
 Trenchard Brat, a nickname for aircraft apprentices in the British Royal Air Force

Films 
 The Brat (1919 film), an early silent film produced by and starring Alla Nazimova
 Brats (1930 film), a 1930 Laurel and Hardy film
 Brats (1991 film), a 1991 Hungarian film
 The Brat, a 1931 film directed by John Ford
 Brother (1997 film) (translit. Brat), a Russian crime film
 Brother 2 (2000 film) (translit. Brat 2), a Russian crime film, sequel to Brother (1997)
 Beverly Hills Brats, a 1989 American film

Music 
 The Brat (band), American punk rock band
Brats (band), Japanese rock band
 Da Brat (born 1974), rapper
 Roger Kitter (born 1950), recorded as The Brat for the song "Chalk Dust - the Umpire Strikes Back"
 "Brat", a song by Green Day from Insomniac
 NME Brat Awards for popular music
 Brat (album), 2020 album by Nnamdi

Other uses 
 Bratwurst, a type of sausage
 BRAT diet, for patients with various forms of gastrointestinal distress
 Subaru BRAT, a pickup truck
 Bratz (dolls), a line of dolls
 Brat, a character (a wild boar-dragon hybrid) on the 1985 children's series The Wuzzles
 Brat TV, a digital network featuring web series broadcast on YouTube
 Brat (video game), a 1991 action puzzle video game
 Brat language, a name sometimes found in the old literature for the Maybrat language of West Papua
 Brat., the abbreviation for the orchid nothogenus × Bratonia
 Brats of the Lost Nebula, a television program by the Jim Henson Company

People with the name 
 Dave Brat (born 1964), American academic and politician

See also
 Bratt (disambiguation)
 Brat Pack (disambiguation)
 Vrata (disambiguation)